Maik Nill (born 6 August 1963) is a German weightlifter. He competed in the men's heavyweight I event at the 1988 Summer Olympics.

References

1963 births
Living people
German male weightlifters
Olympic weightlifters of West Germany
Weightlifters at the 1988 Summer Olympics
Sportspeople from Braunschweig